Otophryne pyburni is a species of frog in the family Microhylidae. It is found in northern South America east of the Andes (northern Brazil, southeastern Colombia, French Guiana, Guyana, Suriname, and southern Venezuela). It is a common, diurnal frog found in tropical rainforest, perching next to streams or living on the forest floor under leaves or among roots. Males are territorial and calling mostly on rainy days. The eggs may be laid either inside or outside water. The tadpoles are aquatic and hide under leaves in small ponds. It is locally threatened by habitat loss.

References

pyburni
Frogs of South America
Amphibians of Brazil
Amphibians of Colombia
Amphibians of French Guiana
Amphibians of Guyana
Amphibians of Suriname
Amphibians of Venezuela
Taxa named by Jonathan A. Campbell
Taxonomy articles created by Polbot
Amphibians described in 1998